Late Night Tales: The Flaming Lips is a compilation album compiled by the members of The Flaming Lips, featuring songs by various artists. The album was released on March 7, 2005 and it features one new Flaming Lips recording, a cover of the White Stripes' "Seven Nation Army".

Late Night Tales: The Flaming Lips is the 13th in the Late Night Tales series. Each installment in the series is a compilation of songs that were influential on or favourites of the featured artist. Previous Late Night Tales compilations have been put together by Four Tet, Nightmares on Wax, Jamiroquai, and Turin Brakes, among others.

Track listing

References

Flaming Lips, The
Albums produced by Nigel Godrich
2005 compilation albums
The Flaming Lips